Poljanec  is a village in Croatia. It is on the D2 highway.

References

Populated places in Varaždin County